The Ashley-Willis House, located in the town of Williston, South Carolina is a notable as one of the few intact, gable-front Greek Revival residences in the state. It was listed in the National Register of Historic Places on June 22, 2004.

References

Houses on the National Register of Historic Places in South Carolina
Greek Revival houses in South Carolina
Houses completed in 1833
Houses in Barnwell County, South Carolina
National Register of Historic Places in Barnwell County, South Carolina
1833 establishments in South Carolina